Igor Andreyevich Polyanski (also transliterated as Polyanskiy or Polyansky), born 16 January 1990 in Zhelesnogorsk), is a Russian professional triathlete, Russian Sprint Champion 2010 and a permanent member of the Russian national team.

He tested positive for doping at the 2020 Summer Olympics and might get suspended pending further review.

Career
Polyanski placed 13th (junior category) in the Russian Cup of the year 2009, and 6th at the Junior World Championships. In 2010, Igor Polyanski won the U23 supersprint at the Russian Championships in Penza and the U23 bronze medal on the Olympic Distance.

In 2010, Igor Polyanski also took part in the prestigious French Club Championship Series Lyonnaise des Eaux representing the club Saint-Raphaël Tri. At the first competition of this circuit in Dunkirk (23 May 2010), Polyanski placed 49th. Incidentally, none of the five athletes representing Saint-Raphaël Tri was French: Dmitry Polyanski, Karl Shaw, Olivier Marceau, Kristian Mac Cartney, and Igor Polyanski.
At the Triathlon de Paris (18 July 2010), Igor Polyanski placed 9th and at the Grand Final in La Baule (Triathlon Audencia, 18 September 2010) he placed 41st.

Igor Polyanski is the younger brother of the professional triathlete Dmitry Polyanski, the husband of the Ukrainian Russian triathlete Anastasiya Polyanskaya. According to media reports, Igor and Lyubov Ivanovskaya are a couple. All four of them will represent Saint Raphaël Triathlon in the Club Championship in 2010.

ITU Competitions 
In the five years from 2006 to 2010, Igor Polyanski took part in 16 ITU competitions and achieved 8 top ten positions.
The following list is based upon the official ITU rankings and the Athlete's Profile Page.
Unless indicated otherwise, the following events are triathlons (Olympic Distance) and belong to the Elite category.

BG = the sponsor British Gas · DNF = did not finish · DNS = did not start · DQ = disqualified

External links 
 Russian Triathlon Federation in Russian

Notes 

Russian male triathletes
1990 births
Living people
Triathletes at the 2016 Summer Olympics
Olympic triathletes of Russia
Russian sportspeople in doping cases
European Games competitors for Russia
Triathletes at the 2015 European Games
Triathletes at the 2020 Summer Olympics